Stig Reuterswärd (17 February 1907 – 5 March 1980) was a Swedish athlete. He competed in the men's 3000 metres team race event at the 1924 Summer Olympics.

References

External links
 

1907 births
1980 deaths
Athletes (track and field) at the 1924 Summer Olympics
Swedish male middle-distance runners
Olympic athletes of Sweden
People from Borås
Sportspeople from Västra Götaland County